Páni kluci is a 1976 Czech adventure film based on The Adventures of Tom Sawyer by Mark Twain.

Cast 
  - Tomás
 Petr Vorísek - Hubert
 Petr Stary - Jozka Vágner 
  - Blanka
 Iva Janžurová - aunt Apolena

References

External links 

1970s adventure films
Czech adventure films
1970s Czech-language films
1970s Czech films